Julián Barrio Barrio (born 15 August 1946) is a Spanish prelate of the Roman Catholic Church. Since January 1996, he has served as Archbishop of Santiago de Compostela.

Early life and education
Barrio was born on 15 August 1946 in Manganeses de la Polvorosa, Zamora, Spain. He studied geography and history at the University of Oviedo, and then studied theology at the Pontifical University of Salamanca. He also holds a doctorate in the history of the Church from the Pontifical Gregorian University.

Ordained ministry

Priesthood
On 4 July 1971, Barrio was ordained a priest in the Roman Catholic Church by Antonio Briva Mirabent. He then served as a parish priest in the Diocese of Astorga. From 1980 to 1992, he was Vice-Rector of the diocese's seminary.

Episcopal ministry
On 31 December 1992, Barrio was appointed by Pope John Paul II as Auxiliary Bishop of the Archdiocese of Santiago de Compostela and Titular Bishop of Sasabe. He was consecrated as a bishop on 7 February 1993 during a Mass at the Cathedral of Santiago de Compostela. The principal consecrator was Antonio María Rouco Varela, assisted by Mario Tagliaferri and Antonio Briva Mirabent. On 5 January 1996, he was named by Pope John Paul II as the next Archbishop of Santiago de Compostela.

See also
Catholic Church in Spain

References

External links

1946 births
Living people
20th-century Roman Catholic archbishops in Spain
21st-century Roman Catholic archbishops in Spain
University of Oviedo alumni
Pontifical University of Salamanca alumni
Pontifical Gregorian University alumni
People from the Province of Zamora